Poppen is a surname. Notable people with the surname include:

 Brent Poppen (born 1973), American wheelchair rugby player, wheelchair tennis player and activist
 Claudio Poppen (born 1974), Aruban football player
 Christoph Poppen (born 1956), German conductor
 Diemut Poppen, German violist
Johannes Poppen (1893–1944), German Painter
 Sean Poppen (born 1994), American baseball player

See also
 Poppens
 Poppin' (disambiguation)